Benjamin Franklin Keller (April 21, 1857 – August 8, 1921) was a United States district judge of the United States District Court for the Southern District of West Virginia.

Education and career

Born in Boalsburg, Pennsylvania, Keller received a Bachelor of Science degree from Pennsylvania State College (now Pennsylvania State University) in 1876, a Master of Science degree from the same institution in 1879, and a Bachelor of Laws from Columbian University School of Law (now George Washington University Law School) in 1882. He was in private practice in Bramwell, West Virginia from 1891 to 1901.

Federal judicial service

Keller received a recess appointment from President William McKinley on June 18, 1901, to the United States District Court for the Southern District of West Virginia, to a new seat authorized by 31 Stat. 736. He was nominated to the same position by President Theodore Roosevelt on December 5, 1901. He was confirmed by the United States Senate on December 17, 1901, and received his commission the same day. His service terminated on August 8, 1921, due to his death.

References

Sources
 

1857 births
1921 deaths
People from Centre County, Pennsylvania
Judges of the United States District Court for the Southern District of West Virginia
United States federal judges appointed by William McKinley
United States federal judges appointed by Theodore Roosevelt
George Washington University Law School alumni